Sirajul Islam (1935 - 29 August 2019)  is a Awami League politician and the former Member of Parliament of Noakhali-13.

Career
Islam was elected to parliament from Noakhali-13 as an Awami League candidate in 1973.

References

Awami League politicians
1st Jatiya Sangsad members
1935 births
2019 deaths